Alfred Evans may refer to:

Alfred Evans (trade unionist) (1851/2–1918), British trade union leader
Alfred Evans (cricketer, born 1858) (1858–1934), English cricketer
Sir Alfred Evans (Royal Navy officer) (1884–1944), British admiral and cricketer
Alfred John Evans (1889–1960), English cricketer, known as John Evans
Alfred Evans (politician) (1914–1987), British Labour politician
Al Evans (1916–1979), American baseball catcher and manager
Alfred S. Evans (1917–1996), American viral epidemiologist
Alfie Evans (footballer) (1917–1992), Australian rules footballer
Alfred Evans (sailor) (1920–1998), South African Olympic sailor

See also
Evan Alfred Evans (1876–1948), U.S. judge
Evans (surname)